Negrilla de Palencia is a sparsely populated village and municipality in the province of Salamanca,  western Spain, part of the autonomous community of Castile-Leon.

Geography

The postal code is 37799.

See also
Palencia de Negrilla
List of municipalities in Salamanca

References

Municipalities in the Province of Salamanca